Richardsville is an unincorporated community in Jefferson County, in the U.S. state of Pennsylvania.

History
A post office was established at Richardsville in 1849, and remained in operation until 1969. By 1850, merchants were in business at Richardsville selling whisky.

References

Unincorporated communities in Jefferson County, Pennsylvania
Unincorporated communities in Pennsylvania